General Miguel Rafael Dávila Cuellar (29 September 1856 – 11 October 1927) was President of Honduras between 18 April 1907 and 28 March 1911. He occupied various posts in the government of Policarpo Bonilla, including Minister of Finance of Honduras. He was Vice President in the cabinet of Manuel Bonilla from 1903 to 1907.

He died in Honduras on 11 October 1927.

References 

1856 births
1927 deaths
Presidents of Honduras
Vice presidents of Honduras
Finance Ministers of Honduras
Liberal Party of Honduras politicians
Honduran military personnel